The 2016–17 Anaheim Ducks season was the 24th season for the National Hockey League (NHL) franchise that was established on June 15, 1993. The Ducks won the Pacific Division for a fifth straight year and the sixth time in franchise history. Anaheim faced the wild-card entrant Calgary Flames in the opening round of the playoffs, where they defeated them in a four-game sweep. They then defeated the Edmonton Oilers in the next round, four games to three. The Ducks then went on to face the Nashville Predators in the Western Conference Finals, where they lost in six games.

The Ducks' qualification to the 2017 Stanley Cup Finals would have been the Ducks' first Finals appearance since 2007 and coincidentally, they were close to rematching the Ottawa Senators for the Stanley Cup prior to Ottawa's elimination by the eventual champion Pittsburgh Penguins in the Eastern Conference Finals.

Standings

Schedule and results

Preseason

Regular season

Playoffs

Player statistics 
Final Stats
Skaters

Goaltenders

†Denotes player spent time with another team before joining the Ducks.  Stats reflect time with the Ducks only.
‡Denotes player was traded mid-season.  Stats reflect time with the Team only.
Bold/italics denotes franchise record.

Awards and honours

Awards

Milestones

Records
 On November 6, 2016, the Ducks set the NHL record for most consecutive victories over a single opponent with 24 wins.

Transactions
Following the end of the Ducks' 2015–16 season, and during the 2016–17 season, this team has been involved in the following transactions:

Trades

Free agents acquired

Free agents lost

Claimed via waivers

Lost via waivers

Lost via retirement

Player signings
The following players were signed by the Ducks. Two-way contracts are marked with an asterisk (*).

Draft picks

Below are the Anaheim Ducks' selections at the 2016 NHL Entry Draft, which was held on June 24–25, 2016, at the First Niagara Center in Buffalo.

Draft notes

 The Pittsburgh Penguins' first-round pick went to the Anaheim Ducks as the result of a trade on June 20, 2016, that sent Frederik Andersen to Toronto in exchange for a second-round pick in 2017 and this pick.
Toronto previously acquired this pick from Pittsburgh as the result of a trade on July 1, 2015, that sent Phil Kessel, Tyler Biggs, Tim Erixon and a conditional second-round pick in 2016 to Pittsburgh in exchange for Nick Spaling, Kasperi Kapanen, Scott Harrington, New Jersey's third-round pick in 2016 and this pick (being conditional at the time of the trade). The condition – Toronto will receive a first-round pick in 2016 if Pittsburgh qualifies for the 2016 Stanley Cup playoffs – was converted on April 2, 2016.

 The Anaheim Ducks' second-round pick went to the Pittsburgh Penguins as the result of a trade on July 28, 2015, that sent Brandon Sutter and a conditional third-round pick in 2016 to Vancouver in exchange for Nick Bonino, Adam Clendening and this pick.
Vancouver previously acquired this pick as the result of a trade on June 30, 2015, that sent Kevin Bieksa to Anaheim in exchange for this pick.

 The Edmonton Oilers' fourth-round pick went to the Anaheim Ducks as the result of a trade on February 29, 2016, that sent Patrick Maroon to Edmonton in exchange for Martin Gernat and this pick.
 The Anaheim Ducks' fifth-round pick went to the Washington Capitals as the result of a trade on February 28, 2016, that sent Brooks Laich, Connor Carrick and a second-round pick in 2016 to Toronto in exchange for Daniel Winnik and this pick. 
Toronto previously acquired this pick as the result of a trade on March 2, 2015, that sent Korbinian Holzer to Anaheim in exchange for Eric Brewer and this pick.

 The Anaheim Ducks' sixth-round pick went to the Florida Panthers as the result of a trade on February 29, 2016, that sent Brandon Pirri to Anaheim in exchange for this pick.

References

Anaheim Ducks seasons
Anaheim Ducks
Mighty Ducks of Anaheim
Mighty Ducks of Anaheim